The Russia Men's Under-19 National Floorball Team is the men's under-19 national floorball team of Russia, and a member of the International Floorball Federation. The team is composed of the best Russian floorball players under the age of 19. The Russian under-19 men's team is currently ranked 11th in the world at floorball, and played in the B-Division at the most recent U-19 World Floorball Championships.

Roster 
The roster at the 2019 U-19 WFC.

As of June 27, 2019

Team Staff 
Head Coach – Roman Vostriakov 

General Manager – Iana Galkina 

Coach – Arman Karkumbaev 

Coach – Anatolii Bykov

Records

All-Time World Championship Records

Head-to-Head International Records

References 

Men's national floorball teams